Igor Vladimirovich Ilyinsky (24 July 1901 – 13 January 1987) was a Soviet and Russian stage and film actor, director and comedian. Hero of Socialist Labour (1974) and People's Artist of the USSR (1949).

Early years
Igor Ilyinsky was born on 24 July 1901 in Moscow. At age 16 he entered the Theatre Studio of Theodore Komisarjevsky and in half a year already debuted on the professional stage in Komissarzhevskaya Theatre. His first theatre role was that of the "Old Man" in Aristophanes' play Lysistrata. In 1920, he joined the Vsevolod Meyerhold Theatre. The young actor's style was in correspondence with the principles of Meyerhold, and so Ilyinsky soon became the central actor of that theatre.
He worked with Meyerhold on several of his most famous productions: Mistery-Buffo (1921), The Forest (1924), The Magnanimous Cuckold (1926), Woe to Wit (1928), The Bedbug (1929). Alongside Erast Garin, he was the most prominent actor in the Meyerhold theater and this is where he learned the acting technique called Biomechanics.

Career in silent cinema
In the mid-1920s Ilyinsky started to appear in movies, where he also played vivid comic characters. In 1924, Yakov Protazanov featured him in his futuristic film Aelita, which was followed by his role in Protazanov's comedy The Tailor from Torzhok (1925). In 1926, he appeared in three films.“I can act on the roof of a train carriage, on the radiator of a moving car, on back of a galloping horse, or while swimming in the sea”.

1930s-1950s
In 1938 he joined the Maly Theatre that had been his favourite one since school years. Afterwards Ilyinsky stayed in the Maly Theatre for almost fifty years and even staged several plays there himself. Ilyinsky would later write that it was Russian classic literature that had helped him overcome the crisis and feeling that he had been unable to create new characters, different from the previous ones. An outstandingly prolific period in the actor's life was related to his work with the film director Grigori Aleksandrov. In 1938 Ilyinsky splendidly acted as Byvalov in the comedy Volga-Volga (for this role, he was awarded Stalin Prize in 1941). He deliberately avoided any comic traits in his character to create a common image of a red-tapist.

The starting point for him was the gracious and stirring character of Lyubov Orlova. He decided to create a totally contrasting character, which he succeeded in. That role brought Ilyinsky the State Prize. Stalin reportedly watched the film sixteen times. At Molotov's birthday party Stalin flung Ilyinsky a remark: “Ah, Byvalov! You are a bureaucrat and I am a bureaucrat. We shall understand each other”. The success of that movie determined the development of Soviet film comedy for the next several decades. However, after the film Ilyinsky almost stopped his film acting. In the mid-1950s Ilyinsky finally got a chance to act in a movie. It was a light comedy, A Crazy Day. The character created by Ilyinsky was a repetition of what he had done 20 years earlier. He managed to play a truly starry film role only 18 years after Volga-Volga. It was the role of the bureaucrat Ogurtsov in the smash-hit comedy Carnival Night, directed by Eldar Ryazanov.

“I was not going to feature the great Igor Ilyinsky in Carnival Night - I felt timid, and understood that being a coryphaeus he would suppress me. When Pyryev offered him for the role of Ogurtsov, I just panicked: he was my idol from childhood, the famous actor of the Meyerhold Theatre! And me, directing my first film, on the other scale!” (Eldar Ryazanov)

Later years
In Maly Theatre at the same time Ilyinsky shifted to portrayals of deeply tragic characters, in particular, from Fyodor Dostoyevsky and Leo Tolstoy. In the late 1960s Ilyinsky went into stage directing. His first stage production was the stage version of Gustave Flaubert's popular novel Madame Bovary. The last period of Ilyinsky's career was marked by his portrayal of Leo Tolstoy in the play Turning Full Circle and of Firs, and his performance in The Cherry Orchard by Anton Chekhov. As a very old person Igor Ilyinsky acted a lot on the radio – almost blind, he was accompanied to the studio.

Death
Igor Ilyinsky died on 13 January 1987, aged 85. His widow, actress Tatyana Yeremeyeva, died on 29 November 2012, aged 99.

Legacy
 A minor planet 3622 Ilinsky, discovered by Soviet astronomer Lyudmila Zhuravleva in 1981 is named after Igor Ilyinsky.

Filmography

1924: Aelita as Kravtsov, amateur sleuth
1924: Papirosnitsa ot Mosselproma as Nikodim Mityushin, bookkeeper
1925: The Tailor from Torzhok as Petya Petelkin
1926: The Three Million Trial as Tapioka
1926: Miss Mend as Tom Hopkins, clerk
1926: Kogda probuzhdayutsa mertvye
1927: A Kiss From Mary Pickford as Goga
1928: Kukla s millionami as Pierre Cuisinai
1930: St. Jorgen's Day as Franz Schulz
1931: Shakhta 12-28 as The Angel
1936: Odnazhdy letom as Teleskop / professor Sen-Verbuda
1938: Volga-Volga as Byvalov
1952: Na vsyakogo mudretsa dovolno prostoty as Krutitsky
1952: Woe from Wit as Anton Antonovich Zagoretski
1952: Wolves and Sheep as Appolon Murzavetsky
1953: Zvanyy uzhin (Short)
1956: Crazy Day (Безумный день) as Zajtsev
1956: Carnival Night as Serafim Ivanovich Ogurtsov
1962: Hussar Ballad as Mikhail Kutuzov
1962: Dinner Time
1969: Staryy znakomyy
1972: Eti raznye, raznye litsa
1974: Yunga severnogo flota
1976: This Is the House That Jack Built (Short) as Narrator (voice)

Honours and awards

 Hero of Socialist Labour (1974)
Honored Artist of the RSFSR (1942)
People's Artist of the RSFSR (1945)
People's Artist of the USSR (1949)
 Three Orders of Lenin (1967, 1971, 1974)
 Order of the October Revolution (1986)
 Order of the Red Banner of Labour, three times (1939, 1949 and 1961)
 Order of Friendship of Peoples (1981)
 Lenin Prize (1980)
 Stalin Prize, 1st class, three times
 for his role as Byvalov in the 1938 film "Volga-Volga" (1941)
 for his role of garlic in the play "In the steppes of Ukraine" AE Korneichuk (1942)
 for his role in the play "Unforgettable 1919" by V. Vishnevskyand (1951)

See also
Vsevolod Meyerhold
Yakov Protazanov
Pyotr Chardynin

References

External links

"A modest life of jolly comedian" (in Russian)
Fragments from autobiography (in Russian)

1901 births
1987 deaths
20th-century Russian male actors
Male actors from Moscow
People from Moskovsky Uyezd
Communist Party of the Soviet Union members
Modernist theatre
Heroes of Socialist Labour
Honored Artists of the RSFSR
People's Artists of the RSFSR
People's Artists of the USSR
Stalin Prize winners
Lenin Prize winners
Recipients of the Order of Friendship of Peoples
Recipients of the Order of Lenin
Recipients of the Order of the Red Banner of Labour
Russian male film actors
Russian male silent film actors
Russian male stage actors
Russian male voice actors
Russian theatre directors
Silent film comedians
Soviet male film actors
Soviet male silent film actors
Soviet male stage actors
Soviet male voice actors
Soviet theatre directors
Spoken word artists
Burials at Novodevichy Cemetery